Hotel Pyrénées is a four-star hotel in  Andorra la Vella, Andorra. Built in 1940, Lonely Planet describes it as being "one of Andorra's few venerable buildings" and containing "haunting old photographs of Andorra in its restaurant". It originally went under the Catalan name "Pirinec" and had 36 rooms but today it has 70 rooms.

References

External links
 Website

Hotels in Andorra
Hotel Pyrenees
Hotel buildings completed in 1940
Hotels established in 1940